Belgium competed at the 2022 World Games held in Birmingham, United States from 7 to 17 July 2022. Athletes representing Belgium won 11 gold medals, four silver medals and five bronze medals. The country finished in 7th place in the medal table.

Medalists

Invitational sports

Competitors

Acrobatic gymnastics 

Belgium won three medals in acrobatic gymnastics.

Air sports 

Belgium competed in drone racing.

Archery 

Belgium competed in archery.

Boules sports 

Belgium competed in boules sports.

Canoe marathon 

Belgium competed in canoe marathon.

Cue sports 

Belgium competed in cue sports.

Dancesport 

Belgium competed in dancesport.

Duathlon

Belgium competed in duathlon.

Ju-jitsu

Belgium competed in ju-jitsu.

Karate 

Belgium competed in karate.

Kickboxing 

Belgium competed in kickboxing.

Korfball 

Belgium won the silver medal in the korfball tournament.

Lifesaving 

Belgium competed in lifesaving.

Orienteering 

Belgium competed in orienteering.

Parkour 

Belgium won one bronze medal in parkour.

Powerlifting 

Belgium competed in powerlifting.

Road speed skating 

Belgium competed in road speed skating.

Sport climbing 

Belgium competed in sport climbing.

Squash 

Belgium won one medal in squash.

Track speed skating 

Belgium competed in track speed skating.

Trampoline gymnastics 

Belgium competed in trampoline gymnastics.

Tug of war 

Belgium won one medal in tug of war.

Water skiing 

Belgium competed in water skiing.

References 

Nations at the 2022 World Games
World Games
2022